Whitemoor may refer to:

Whitemoor, Cornwall, England, village 
Whitemoor, Nottinghamshire, area of the City of Nottingham, England
Whitemoor Haye, area in the floodplain of the River Tame, Staffordshire, England
Whitemoor (HM Prison), prison in Cambridgeshire, England
Whitemoor marshalling yards, marshalling yards in Cambridgeshire, England
Whitemoor, a pit in the Selby Coalfield, England

See also
Harap Alb, a Romanian-language fairy tale, often translated as "White Moor"